Ib Ivan Larsen (born 1 April 1945) is a Danish rower who competed in the 1968 Summer Olympics.

He was born in Kongens Lyngby.

In 1964 he was a crew member of the Danish boat which won the bronze medal in the coxless pairs competition.

External links
 profile

1945 births
Living people
Danish male rowers
Olympic rowers of Denmark
Rowers at the 1968 Summer Olympics
Olympic bronze medalists for Denmark
Olympic medalists in rowing
Medalists at the 1968 Summer Olympics
People from Kongens Lyngby
European Rowing Championships medalists
Sportspeople from the Capital Region of Denmark